The Hadeed Plateau is a rangeland situated in the eastern Sanaag region of Somaliland. The plateau dips to the south-east and has substantial areas of gypsum.

Towns and cities such as Hingalol, Armale and Damala Xagare are situated in the plateau. The area is also noted for its wildlife and horse (faras) culture. Known locally as "Sunnari Manaa", the horse breeds mainly graze in the rangeland

See also
Sanaag

Notes

External links
Warsangeli Sultanate 
Image of Somali Horses
Somalia's Horses that feeds his Master

Geography of Somalia